Chalchiuhcozcatzin was a Queen of Azcapotzalco as a wife of the famous king Tezozomoc. She was his main wife.

His other wife was the Queen Tzihuacxochitzin I.

Chalchiuhcozcatzin was the mother of king Tayatzin, who ruled for very short time, because his throne was usurped by his half-brother Maxtla.

References

Nahua nobility
Queens consort
Indigenous Mexican women
Nobility of the Americas